The following low-power television stations broadcast on digital or analog channel 10 in the United States:

 K10AC-D in Ashland, Montana
 K10AD-D in Vallecito, Colorado
 K10AH-D in Emigrant, Montana
 K10AP-D in Pateros/Mansfield, Washington
 K10AW-D in Challis, Idaho
 K10BA-D in Orondo, etc., Washington
 K10BD-D in Winthrop-Twisp, Washington
 K10BK-D in Big Sandy, Montana
 K10BU-D in Lund & Preston, Nevada
 K10CG-D in Aztec, New Mexico
 K10DK-D in Malott Wakefield, Washington
 K10DL-D in Tonasket, Washington
 K10DM-D in Riverside, Washington
 K10DT in Huntsville, etc., Utah
 K10FC-D in Dodson, Montana
 K10FQ-D in Big Laramie, etc., Wyoming
 K10GF-D in Miles City, Montana
 K10GT-D in Mina/Luning, Nevada
 K10HL-D in Virginia City, Montana
 K10HO-D in Big Piney, etc., Wyoming
 K10IX-D in Newberry Springs, California
 K10JK-D in Hinsdale, Montana
 K10JW-D in Verdigre, Nebraska
 K10KG-D in Tenakee Springs, Alaska
 K10KH-D in Shageluk, Alaska
 K10KM-D in Cape Girardeau, Missouri
 K10KR-D in Coolin, Idaho
 K10LG-D in Dryden, Washington
 K10LH-D in West Glacier, etc., Montana
 K10LJ-D in Galena, Alaska
 K10LM-D in Laketown, etc., Utah
 K10LQ-D in Manhattan, Nevada
 K10LU-D in Nightmute, Alaska
 K10MA-D in Waunita Hot Springs, Colorado
 K10MG-D in Socorro, New Mexico
 K10MZ-D in Dolores, Colorado
 K10NC-D in Kenai, etc., Alaska
 K10NF-D in Halfway, Oregon
 K10NY-D in Ismay Canyon, Colorado
 K10OD-D in Weber Canyon, Colorado
 K10OG-D in Lompoc, California
 K10PM-D in Breckenridge, Colorado
 K10PN-D in Cedar City, etc., Utah
 K10PR-D in Thomasville, Colorado
 K10PS-D in Pine Ridge, South Dakota
 K10PV-D in Santa Barbara, California
 K10PW-D in Gallup, New Mexico
 K10QH-D in Trout Creek, etc., Montana
 K10QJ-D in Mink Creek, Idaho
 K10QL-D in Abilene, Texas
 K10QR-D in Leamington, Utah
 K10QX-D in Reno, Nevada
 K10QY-D in Silver City, New Mexico
 K10QZ-D in Rosebud, etc., Montana
 K10RA-D in Coulee City, Washington
 K10RB-D in Mesa, Colorado
 K10RC-D in Denton, Montana
 K10RF-D in Long Valley Junction, Utah
 K10RI-D in Marysvale, Utah
 K10RJ-D in Woodland & Kamas, Utah
 K10RL-D in East Price, Utah
 K10RN-D in Helper, Utah
 K10RO-D in Roosevelt, etc., Utah
 K10RP-D in Santa Clara, Utah
 K10RV-D in Centerville, Washington
 K10RW-D in Lake Havasu, Arizona
 K15FF-D in Salina & Redmond, Utah
 K42AD-D in Blanding/Monticello, Utah
 K47BD-D in Rural Juab County, Utah
 KGBY-LD in Palm Springs, California
 KHDT-LD in Denver, Colorado
 KHLM-LD in Houston, Texas
 KHPK-LD in De Soto, Texas
 KIIO-LD in Los Angeles, California
 KMCA-LD in Redding, California
 KRDJ-LD in Lubbock, Texas
 KRVD-LD in Banning, California
 KSAA-LD in San Antonio, Texas
 KUVM-LD in Houston, Texas, uses KHLM-LD's spectrum
 KWHS-LD in Colorado Springs, Colorado
 KXNU-LD in Laredo, Texas
 KZSW-LD in Riverside, California
 W10AD-D in Montreat, North Carolina
 W10AJ-D in Greenville, South Carolina
 W10AK-D in Spruce Pine, North Carolina
 W10AL-D in Cherokee, etc., North Carolina
 W10BG-D in Mayaguez, Puerto Rico
 W10CP-D in Towanda, Pennsylvania
 W10DD-D in San Juan, Puerto Rico
 W10DF-D in Canton, etc., North Carolina
 WFSF-LD in Key West, Florida
 WGOM-LD in Panama City, Florida
 WIRP-LD in Raleigh, North Carolina
 WMVS (DRT) in Milwaukee, Wisconsin
 WNXY-LD in New York, New York
 WSJT-LD in Atlantic City, New Jersey
 WTTD-LD in Hampton, Virginia
 WWCI-CD in Vero Beach, Florida
 WYGN-LD in Berrien Springs, Michigan

The following low-power stations, which are no longer licensed, formerly broadcast on analog or digital channel 10:
 K10AF-D in Troy, Montana
 K10AJ in Howard, Montana
 K10AT in Circle, etc., Montana
 K10AU in North Fork, etc., Montana
 K10AY in Henefer, etc., Utah
 K10AZ in Spring Glen, etc., Utah
 K10BB-D in Ardenvoir, Washington
 K10CH in Mount Pleasant, Utah
 K10CK in Kanarraville, Utah
 K10CL in Scofield, Utah
 K10CT in Sigurd & Salina, Utah
 K10CU in Koosharem, Utah
 K10DD in Roosevelt, etc., Utah
 K10DE in Duchesne, Utah
 K10DF in Coulee City, Washington
 K10EA in Lake City, Colorado
 K10EB in Scipio/Holden, Utah
 K10EQ in Potter Valley, California
 K10ES in Wendover, Utah
 K10FW in Morgan, etc., Utah
 K10FZ in Hopland, California
 K10GP in Verdi, Nevada
 K10HH in Big Springs, Texas
 K10HJ in Kings River, etc., Nevada
 K10HM in St. Regis, Montana
 K10HQ in Smith, Nevada
 K10HX in Garberville, California
 K10IN in Chinle, Arizona
 K10IV in Capitol Reef National, Utah
 K10JB in Peoa/Oakley, Utah
 K10JG in Boulder, Utah
 K10KB-D in Austin, Nevada
 K10KN in Fruitland, Utah
 K10KO in Wanship, Utah
 K10LD-D in Dillingham, Alaska
 K10LL in Pipe Creek, etc., Montana
 K10LR in Brookings, Oregon
 K10MB in Girdwood, Alaska
 K10MI in McKinley Park, Alaska
 K10MT in Chickaloon, Alaska
 K10OB in Delta Junction, Alaska
 K10OX in Logan, Utah
 K10PL-D in Victoria, Texas
 K10RM-D in Kingman, Arizona
 KBBA-LP in Lake Havasu City, Arizona
 KBNB-LD in San Antonio, Texas
 KNEE-LD in Malaga, etc., Washington
 KRYD-LP in Vail, Colorado
 KWKM-LP in Show Low, Arizona
 W10BM in Morehead, Kentucky
 W10CM in Hilliard, Florida
 WBPN-LP in Morris, New York
 WGVI-LP in Hattiesburg, Mississippi
 WXFL-LD in Florence, etc., Alabama

References

10 low-power